Chelsea Lewis may refer to:

 Chelsea Lewis (netball)
 Chelsea Lewis (South of Nowhere)